Agulla bicolor is a species of snakefly in the family Raphidiidae. It is found in North America.

References

Further reading

 

Raphidioptera
Articles created by Qbugbot
Insects described in 1891